Len Kasper is an American sportscaster. As of 2021 he is the radio play-by-play announcer for the Chicago White Sox of Major League Baseball, teaming with color analyst Darrin Jackson on ESPN 1000 and the Chicago White Sox Radio Network.

From 2005 to 2020, Kasper worked alongside analysts Bob Brenly and Jim Deshaies on Chicago Cubs telecasts. He also joined the team's radio network for the fifth inning of games that were televised nationally (including playoff games), working with regular radio announcers Pat Hughes and Ron Coomer.

Career 
Kasper first worked for WTMJ-AM (620) from 1994 to 2002 in Milwaukee as the host of the station's daily sports show, hosted pregame and halftime shows for the Green Bay Packers, and was a co-host on a hot stove league show on the Brewers' radio network. After realizing he would need experience calling baseball games, he started working with Brett Dolan on the weekends in the late 1990s calling several innings at a time for the Beloit Snappers. In 1999, he was then asked to  do fill-in TV work with the Milwaukee Brewers for Matt Vasgersian who started to get work on the national stage. Kasper continued to work alongside Bill Schroeder as a fill-in for Vasgersian on Brewers telecasts through 2001.

In 2002, Kasper was hired as a full-time TV play-by-play announcer to work alongside color commentator Tommy Hutton for the Florida Marlins and worked for Florida through the 2004 season until being hired for the Cubs in 2005. Kasper received the Harry Caray Sportscaster of the Year Award from the Pitch and Hit Club of Chicago in 2011.

On Friday, December 4, 2020, it was announced that he would be leaving the Chicago Cubs TV broadcasting booth to go to the Chicago White Sox lead radio announcing booth for WMVP 1000 AM and fill-in TV work for NBC Sports Chicago for the 2021 season. He was replaced by Jon Sciambi.

Personal life 
Kasper grew up in Michigan. His broadcasting influence was the Detroit Tigers' radio broadcasters, Ernie Harwell and Paul Carey. He graduated from Shepherd High School. He graduated summa cum laude from Marquette University with a degree in public relations in 1993. He and his wife, Pam, have one son named Leo.

References

External links
Chicago Cubs Broadcasters at Comcastsportsnet.com
Ask Len and Bob at Comcastsportsnet.com
Chicago Cubs Broadcasters at Cubs.com 
Len & Bob's baseball blog at WGN Sports.com
Len & Bob play Summertime Blues.

Living people
American radio sports announcers
American television sports announcers
Chicago Cubs announcers
Chicago White Sox announcers
Florida Marlins announcers
Green Bay Packers announcers
Major League Baseball broadcasters
Marquette University alumni
Milwaukee Brewers announcers
Minor League Baseball broadcasters
National Football League announcers
Year of birth missing (living people)